George Foster may refer to:

Politics
George Buchanan Foster (1897–1974), Canadian flying ace, attorney, and legislator
George Eulas Foster (1847–1931), Canadian politician
George Foster (Australian politician) (1884–1956), Australian Senator
George Peter Foster (1858–1928), U.S. Representative from Illinois
George Foster Peabody (1852–1938), American educator and political figure
Bill Foster (politician) (George William Foster, born 1955), American physicist and politician

Sportspeople
George Foster (American football) (born 1980), former American football player
George Foster (baseball) (born 1948), American former baseball player
George Foster (boxer), former American boxer
George Foster (darts player) (born 1939), former Australian darts player
George Foster (footballer) (born 1956), former British football player and manager for Plymouth Argyle F.C.

Other people
George Green Foster (1860–1931), Canadian lawyer and politician
George P. Foster (1835–1879), Union general in the American Civil War
George Foster, pen-name of Jock Haswell (1919–2018), British soldier, intelligence officer and author 
George Burman Foster (1858–1919),  American theologian at the University of Chicago
George M. Foster (anthropologist) (1913–2006), anthropologist at the University of California, Berkeley
George Washington Foster (1866–1923), African-American architect
Pops Foster (George Murphy Foster, 1892–1969), jazz musician

See also 
George Forster (disambiguation)
George Forster (murderer) (also called Foster, died 1803), convicted criminal whose body was experimented on after he was hanged